An undulator is an insertion device from high-energy physics and usually part of a larger
installation, a synchrotron storage ring, or it may be a component of a free electron laser. It consists of a periodic structure of dipole magnets. These can be permanent magnets or superconducting magnets. The static magnetic field alternates along the length of the undulator with a wavelength . Electrons traversing the periodic magnet structure are forced to undergo oscillations and thus to radiate energy. The radiation produced in an undulator is very intense and concentrated in narrow energy bands in the spectrum. It is also collimated on the orbit plane of the electrons. This radiation is guided through beamlines for experiments in various scientific areas.

The undulator strength parameter is:
,

where e is the electron charge, B is the magnetic field,  is the spatial period of the undulator magnets,  is the electron rest mass, and c is the speed of light.

This parameter characterizes the nature of the electron motion. For  the oscillation amplitude of the motion is small and the radiation displays interference patterns which lead to narrow energy bands. If  the oscillation amplitude is bigger and the radiation contributions from each field period sum up independently, leading to a broad energy spectrum. In this regime of fields the device is no longer called an undulator; it is called a wiggler. 

The key difference between undulator and wiggler is coherence. In the case of an undulator, the emitted radiation is coherent with a wavelength determined by the period length and the beam energy, while in wiggler the electrons are not coherent.

The usual description of the undulator is relativistic but classical. This means that although a precise calculation is tedious, the undulator can be seen as a black box, where only functions inside the device affect how an input is converted to an output; an electron enters the box and an electromagnetic pulse exits through a small exit slit. The slit should be small enough such that only the main cone passes, and the side lobes of the wavelength spectra can be ignored.

Undulators can provide several orders of magnitude higher flux than a simple bending magnet and as such are in high demand at synchrotron radiation facilities. For an undulator with N periods, the brightness can be up to  more than a bending magnet. The first factor of N occurs because the intensity is enhanced up to a factor of N at harmonic wavelengths due to the constructive interference of the fields emitted during the N radiation periods. The usual pulse is a sine with some envelope. The second factor of N comes from the reduction of the emission angle associated with these harmonics, which is reduced as 1/N. When the electrons come with half the period, they interfere destructively, the undulator stays dark. The same is true, if they come as a bead chain.

The polarization of the emitted radiation can be controlled by using permanent magnets to induce different periodic electron trajectories through the undulator. If the oscillations are confined to a plane the radiation will be linearly polarized. If the oscillation trajectory is helical, the radiation will be circularly polarized, with the handedness determined by the helix.

If the electrons follow the Poisson distribution a partial interference leads to a linear increase in intensity.
In the free electron laser the intensity increases exponentially with the number of electrons.

An undulator's figure of merit is spectral radiance.

History
The Russian physicist Vitaly Ginzburg showed theoretically that undulators could be built in a 1947 paper. Julian Schwinger published a useful paper in 1949 that reduced the necessary calculations to Bessel functions, for which there were tables. This was significant for solving the design equations as digital computers were not available to most academics at that time.

Hans Motz and his coworkers at Stanford University demonstrated the first undulator in 1952. It produced the first manmade coherent infrared radiation. The design could produce a total frequency range from visible light down to millimeter waves.

References

External links
D. T. Attwood's page at Berkeley: Soft X-Rays and Extreme Ultraviolet Radiation. His lecture and viewgraphs are available online.

Synchrotron instrumentation

fr:Synchrotron#Éléments d'insertion